Phyllanthus marchionicus is a species of tree in the family Phyllanthaceae. It is endemic to the Marquesas Islands in French Polynesia, where it grows on the islands of Nuku Hiva, Ua Pou, Ua Huka, Hiva Oa, Tahuata, and Fatu Hiva, in a variety of habitats.

References

Flora of French Polynesia
Least concern plants
marchionicus
Taxonomy articles created by Polbot
Taxobox binomials not recognized by IUCN